The 2016 Haarlem Baseball Week was an international baseball competition held at the Pim Mulier Stadium in Haarlem, the Netherlands from 15–24 July 2016. It was the 28th edition of the tournament.

In the final the Netherlands won over Japan, becoming champions for the fourth time.

For the first time in the history of the Haarlem Baseball Week a youth tournament was organised as well, called the Honkbalweek Haarlem Cup.

Teams
Originally, six teams were invited to the tournament. However, the team from the United States had to withdraw because of sponsor obligations. The organisation was not able to find a replacement team, leaving five participating teams.

 
 Chinese Taipei is the official IBAF designation for the team representing the state officially referred to as the Republic of China, more commonly known as Taiwan. (See also political status of Taiwan for details.)
 Players from Curaçao previously competed at the Haarlem Baseball Week as part of the Dutch Caribbean team.

Group stage

Standings

Game results

Knock-out phase

Final

Final standings

Tournament awards

External links
Official Website

References

Haarlem Baseball Week